Patali (also Romanized as Pātalī) is a village in Khatunabad Rural District, in the Central District of Jiroft County, Kerman Province, Iran. At the 2006 census, its population was 23, in 7 families.

References 

Populated places in Jiroft County